The 2017 Sport Clips Haircuts VFW 200 was the 24th stock car race of the 2017 NASCAR Xfinity Series season, and the 25th iteration of the event. The race was held on Saturday, September 2, 2017, in Darlington, South Carolina at Darlington Raceway, a 1.366 miles (2.198 km) permanent tri-oval racetrack. The race was increased from 147 laps to 148 laps, due to a NASCAR overtime finish. Denny Hamlin, driving for Joe Gibbs Racing, held off Joey Logano in an exciting battle with 2 laps to go, and would earn his 17th career NASCAR Xfinity Series win, along with his first of the season. To fill out the podium, Kevin Harvick, driving for Stewart-Haas Racing, would finish in 3rd, respectively.

Background 

The race was held at Darlington Raceway, which is a race track built for NASCAR racing located in Darlington, South Carolina. It is nicknamed "The Lady in Black" and "The Track Too Tough to Tame" by many NASCAR fans and drivers and advertised as "A NASCAR Tradition." It is of a unique, somewhat egg-shaped design, an oval with the ends of very different configurations, a condition which supposedly arose from the proximity of one end of the track to a minnow pond the owner refused to relocate. This situation makes it very challenging for the crews to set up their cars' handling in a way that will be effective at both ends.

Entry list 

 (R) denotes rookie driver.
 (i) denotes driver who is ineligible for series driver points.

Practice

First practice 
The first 55-minute practice session was held on Friday, September 1, at 12:00 PM EST.

Final practice 
The final 55-minute practice session was held on Friday, September 1, at 2:30 PM EST.

Qualifying 
Qualifying was held on Saturday, September 2, at 12:05 PM EST. Since Darlington Raceway is under 2 miles (3.2 km), the qualifying system was a multi-car system that included three rounds. The first round was 15 minutes, where every driver would be able to set a lap within the 15 minutes. Then, the second round would consist of the fastest 24 cars in Round 1, and drivers would have 10 minutes to set a lap. Round 3 consisted of the fastest 12 drivers from Round 2, and the drivers would have 5 minutes to set a time. Whoever was fastest in Round 3 would win the pole.

Full starting lineup

Race results 
Stage 1 Laps: 45

Stage 2 Laps: 45

Stage 3 Laps: 58

Standings after the race 

Drivers' Championship standings

Note: Only the first 12 positions are included for the driver standings.

References 

2017 NASCAR Xfinity Series
NASCAR races at Darlington Raceway
September 2017 sports events in the United States
2017 in sports in South Carolina